Grogarnsberget or Grogarnsberg (lit. "The Grogarn Mountain" more appropriate "Grogarn Hill") is a plateau hill on the Östergarn coast, on the Swedish island of Gotland. On the hill are the remains of former hillfort, the second largest on Gotland and the fourth largest in Scandinavia.

Geography 
The hill is on the northeast coast of the most eastern part of Gotland. The hill provides a good view of Östergarnsholm with its two lighthouses. In the west, east and south are the historic harbors Katthammarsvik, Herrvik, and Sandviken, formerly starting points for journeys across the Baltic Sea to the Baltic.

The Grogarnsberget is also a nature reserve and it is designated a Natura 2000 area.

Hillfort 

The castle, or fort, was built on Grogarnshuvud ("The Grogarn Head"), the northern tip of Grogarnsberget. From the site of the former castle, other major hillforts in the region are visible. Archaeological investigations of the outer ramparts turned up arrowheads from the late Vendel Period (550-800 AD), which provided a clue as to the dating of the castle. A number of wooden posts were also found, probably formerly part of the palisades, that were dated to 740 AD. The fort had both an outer and an inner wall.

There are 82 such forts known on Gotland. The one on Grogarnsberget, however, measures , making it one of the two largest hillforts on the island. House foundations from the Roman Iron Age – the Migration Period – were found inside the fortifications, unlike any other hillforts on the island.

References

Bibliography

External links 
 
 

Nature reserves in Sweden
Geography of Gotland County
Natura 2000 in Sweden
Migration Period
Hill forts in Sweden
Buildings and structures in Gotland County
Vendel Period
Ruined castles in Sweden